Egbert Don Taylor (September 2, 1937 – May 24, 2014) was third bishop of the Episcopal Diocese of the Virgin Islands (1987–1994), and an assistant bishop in the Episcopal Diocese of New York (1994–2009).

Biography
Born in Kingston, Jamaica, Taylor was educated at Kingston College. He studied broadcasting and went on to work for RJR Radio in Canada for 19 years, before being ordained to the diaconate and priesthood by Percival Gibson in 1961.
After ordination he was appointed to St Mary the Virgin Church in Kingston, Jamaica. In 1970 he became Headmaster of Kingston College. In 1973 he left for the United States and became rector of Church of the Holy Cross in Decatur, Georgia, and served as Jamaican Honorary Consul to Atlanta. He was elected Bishop of the Virgin Islands in 1986 and was consecrated on February 24, 1987.

References

1937 births
2014 deaths
People from Kingston, Jamaica
Jamaican Anglicans
20th-century Anglican bishops in the Caribbean
21st-century Anglican bishops in the Caribbean
20th-century American Episcopalians
Episcopal bishops of the Virgin Islands
20th-century American clergy
21st-century American clergy